Avey is an English surname. Notable people with this surname include:

Albert Edwin Avey (1886–1963), American philosopher
 Dan Avey (1941–2010), American media personality
 Denis Avey (1919–2015), British Hero of the Holocaust
 Fred Avey, English footballer
 Linda Avey (born 1960), American biologist and entrepreneur
 Sam Avey (1895–1962), American sports promoter

 As a forename
 Avey Tare (born 1979), American musician

 Other
 Avey temple
 Avey's Coliseum
 Avey Field State Airport
 FC Avey Akstafa

See also 
 Aveyard
 Aveyron (disambiguation)

English-language surnames